René Ansermoz (born 1904, date of death unknown) was a Swiss bobsledder. He competed in the four-man event at the 1928 Winter Olympics.

References

External links
  

1904 births
Year of death missing
Swiss male bobsledders
Olympic bobsledders of Switzerland
Bobsledders at the 1928 Winter Olympics
Place of birth missing
Date of birth missing
20th-century Swiss people